The 2006 Brown Bears football team was an American football team that represented Brown University during the 2006 NCAA Division I FCS football season. A year after winning the conference championship, Brown tied for last in the Ivy League. 

In their ninth season under head coach Phil Estes, the Bears compiled a 3–7 record and were outscored 225 to 241. Zak DeOssie, Joe DiGiacomo and Brandon Markey were the team captains. 

The Bears' 2–5 conference record placed them in a three-way tie for sixth in the Ivy League standings. Brown was outscored 157 to 140 by Ivy opponents. 

Brown played its home games at Brown Stadium in Providence, Rhode Island.

Schedule

References

Brown
Brown Bears football seasons
Brown Bears football